(English title Otherworld: not a literal translation) is a 2003 Welsh film based on a series of Welsh tales written by bards in the Middle Ages. It is mostly animated, although the very beginning and end sequences are live action. It follows three main characters who find themselves moving from their world in West Wales to the setting of the tales of Welsh mythology known as the Four Branches of the Mabinogi (often referred to as simply Y Mabinogi), from which the film's title is derived. The film is available in both Welsh and English language versions, as is the graphic novel on which the film is based.

See also
List of animated feature films

External links

2003 films
2003 animated films
British animated films
Welsh films
Mabinogion
Animated films based on Celtic mythology
Films set in the Middle Ages
Films set in Wales
Films based on British novels
Films with live action and animation
Films scored by John Cale
English-language Welsh films
2000s British films